Louey is a commune in the Hautes-Pyrénées department in south-western France.

Notable people
Jacques Duclos (1896–1975), communist politician
Jean Duclos (1895–1957), French politician

See also
Communes of the Hautes-Pyrénées department

References

Communes of Hautes-Pyrénées